Station 19 is an American action-drama television series that premiered on American Broadcasting Company (ABC) as a mid-season replacement on March 22, 2018. The series has aired for six seasons, and focuses on lives of the firefighters working on the fictional Station 19, while trying to maintain personal lives. The show is a spin-off series of long running medical drama Grey's Anatomy. The story was introduced with an episode of Grey's Anatomy (originally planned to air in fall 2017) serving as a backdoor pilot. The backdoor pilot episode also featured the introduction of the lead character of the spin-off, Andy Herrera, "as a story within the episode" and "showcase a really lovely story for Ben, where we get to just juxtapose his two worlds and see his reaction as he transitions from one world to the next".

In March 2020, ABC renewed the series for a fourth season which premiered on November 12, 2020. In May 2021, the series was renewed for a fifth season which premiered on September 30, 2021. In January 2022, ABC renewed the series for a sixth season which premiered on October 6, 2022.

Series overview

Episodes

Backdoor pilot (2018)

For the backdoor pilot, "No. overall" and "No. in season" refer to the episode's place in the order of episodes of the parent series Grey's Anatomy.

Season 1 (2018)

Season 2 (2018–19)

Season 3 (2020)

Season 4 (2020–21)

Season 5 (2021–22)

Season 6 (2022–23)

Ratings

Season 1

Season 2

Season 3

Season 4

Season 5

Season 6

Notes

References 

Lists of American drama television series episodes